This article contains information about the literary events and publications of 2006.

Events
March – The first full-length original novel in the Manx language, Dunveryssyn yn Tooder-Folley ("The Vampire Murders") is published by Brian Stowell, after being serialized in the press.
April 7 – Justice Peter Smith concludes in a case of February 27 in the London High Court of Justice against the publisher Random House over the bestselling novel The Da Vinci Code (2003), that the author, Dan Brown, has not breached the copyright of Michael Baigent and Richard Leigh in their The Holy Blood and the Holy Grail (1982, non-fiction). The judgment also contains a coded message on the whim of the judge.
April 7–9 – First Jaipur Literature Festival held in India.
Summer – Brutalism becomes the first literary movement to be launched through the social networking site Myspace.
June 14 – Ciaran Creagh's play Last Call, based loosely on the hanging of the murderer Michael Manning in 1954, as witnessed by the playwright's father, is staged in Mountjoy Prison, Dublin, where it is set.
June–September – Elif Şafak is tried for "insulting Turkishness" in her novel The Bastard of Istanbul, published earlier in the year, but eventually acquitted.
June 7 – The final portion of the library accumulated by Sir Thomas Phillipps (died 1872) is sold by Christie's in London.
July 14 – The Times Literary Supplement reports on the discovery of a missing copy of Shelley's Poetical Essay on the Existing State of Things, an 1811 pamphlet containing a 172-line poem critical of war, politics and religion; although published anonymously, the poem is thought to have contributed to the rebel poet's expulsion from the University of Oxford (which acquires the unique copy of the pamphlet in 2015).
July 21 – The writers of America's Next Top Model go on strike while working on Cycle 7, due to be broadcast on the new CW Network in September 2006. The writers seek representation through the Writers Guild of America, which would allow them regulated wages, access to portable health insurance, and pension benefits. These benefits would be similar to those given to writers on scripted shows.
August 1 – The University of Helsinki library becomes the National Library of Finland (Kansalliskirjasto).
September – Museum of Modern Literature opens in Marbach am Neckar, Schiller's birthplace in Germany.
September 20 – The Writers Guild of America, West, holds a Los Angeles rally in support of the "America's Next Top Model" writers' strike. President Patric Verrone says: "Every piece of media with a moving image on a screen or a recorded voice must have a writer, and every writer must have a WGA contract."
November 6 – WGAw files an unfair labor practice complaint with the National Labor Relations Board after "Top Model" producers say the next season of the show will not require writers. In response, Verrone said, "As they demanded union representation, the company decided they were expendable. This is illegal strikebreaking."

New books

Fiction
Chimamanda Ngozi Adichie – Half of a Yellow Sun
Naomi Alderman – Disobedience
Martin Amis – House of Meetings
Margaret Atwood – Moral Disorder
Muriel Barbery – The Elegance of the Hedgehog (L'Élégance du hérisson) (France, Gallimard)
Brunonia Barry – The Lace Reader
François Bégaudeau – Entre les murs (Between the Walls)
Peter Behrens – The Law of Dreams
William Boyd – Restless
T. C. Boyle – Talk Talk
James Chapman – Stet (January 7)
Douglas Coupland – jPod
Mark Z. Danielewski – Only Revolutions
N. Frank Daniels – Futureproof
Patricia Duncker – Miss Webster and Chérif
Dave Eggers – What Is the What: The Autobiography of Valentino Achak Deng (October 25)
Agustín Fernández Mallo – Nocillo (trilogy, begins publication)
Sebastian Fitzek – Therapy (Die Therapie)
Aminatta Forna – Ancestor Stones
Wendy Guerra – Todos se van (Everyone's Leaving)
Katharina Hacker – Die Habenichtse (The Have-Nots)
Margaret Peterson Haddix – Among the Free
Rawi Hage – De Niro's Game
Hiro Arikawa – Library War (図書館戦争 Toshokan Sensō)
Anosh Irani – The Song of Kahunsha (Canada, Doubleday)
Lloyd Jones – Mister Pip
Torsten Krol – The Dolphin People
Vincent Lam – Bloodletting and Miraculous Cures
Jon McGregor – So Many Ways to Begin
David Mitchell – Black Swan Green
Alice Munro – The View from Castle Rock
Amélie Nothomb  – Journal d'Hirondelle
Joyce Carol Oates – Black Girl/White Girl
Heather O'Neill – Lullabies for Little Criminals
Carolyn Parkhurst – Lost and Found
Thomas Pynchon – Against the Day (November 21)
Christoph Ransmayr – The Flying Mountain (Der fliegende Berg)
James Robertson – The Testament of Gideon Mack
Will Self – The Book of Dave
Olga Slavnikova – 2017
Ngũgĩ wa Thiong'o – Wizard of the Crow (Gikuyu: Mũrogi wa Kagogo)
Lynne Tillman – American Genius, A Comedy
John Updike – Terrorist (June 6)
Mario Vargas Llosa – The Bad Girl (Travesuras de la niña mala)

Children and young people
Chris Van Allsburg – Probuditi!
Dave Barry & Ridley Pearson – Peter and the Shadow Thieves (July 15)
Kirsten Boie – Ritter Trenk
John Boyne – The Boy in the Striped Pyjamas
Eoin Colfer – Artemis Fowl and the Lost Colony (September 12, fifth in the Artemis Fowl series)
John Fardell – The Flight of the Silver Turtle
Jean-Luc Fromental – 365 Penguins
Julia Golding – Secret of the Sirens (August 3, UK, first in the Companions Quartet)
John Green – An Abundance of KatherinesCharlie Higson – Blood Fever (January 1, second in the Young James Bond series)
J. Patrick Lewis (with Gary Kelley) – Black Cat Bone: A Live of Blues Legend Robert Johnson in VerseSam Lloyd – Mr. PusskinsD. J. MacHale – The Quillan Games (May 16)
David Mitchell – Black Swan Green (April 11)
Robert MuchamoreDivine Madness (fifth in the CHERUB series)Man vs Beast (sixth in the CHERUB series)
Jenny Nimmo – Charlie Bone and the Hidden KingGarth Nix – Sir Thursday (March 1) (fourth in The Keys to the Kingdom series)
Jerry Pinkney – The Little Red Hen (Pinkney book)Terry Pratchett – Wintersmith (October 1, third in the Tiffany Aching series)
Philip Reeve – A Darkling PlainLemony Snicket – The End (October 13) (13th in A Series of Unfortunate Events)
Dugald Steer (with Nghiem Ta, etc.) – Pirateology: A Pirate Hunter's CompanionPaul Stewart – Freeglader (February 28, eighth in The Edge Chronicles)
K. J. Taylor – The Land of Bad FantasyToshihiko Tsukiji and Senmu – Kämpfer (けんぷファー, November 24)
Victoria Kann and Elizabeth Kann – PinkaliciousGenre fictionFantasyJoe Abercrombie – The Blade Itself (May 4, first in First Law series)
R. Scott Bakker – The Thousandfold Thought (January 20, third in Prince of Nothing trilogy)
Steven Erikson – The Bonehunters (March 1, sixth in Malazan Book of the Fallen series)
Terry Goodkind – Phantom (July 18, 10th in Sword of Truth series)
Laurell K. Hamilton – Mistral's Kiss (December 12, fifth in Merry Gentry series)
Sherrilyn Kenyon – Dark Side of the Moon (May 30, 15th in Dark-Hunter series)
Gregory Keyes – The Blood Knight (July 11, third in The Kingdoms of Thorn and Bone series)
Dean Koontz – Brother Odd (November 28, third in Odd Thomas series)
Tanith Lee – Piratica II (second in The Piratica Series)
Scott Lynch – The Lies of Locke Lamora (June 27, first in Gentleman Bastards series)
Patricia A. McKillip – Solstice WoodZhang Muye – Ghost Blows Out the Light (March)
James Patterson – School's Out – Forever (May 23, second in Maximum Ride series)
Angie Sage – Flyte (March 1, second in Septimus Heap series)
Darren ShanBec (October 2, fourth in The Demonata series)Demon Thief (June 7) (second in Demonata series)Slawter (November 1, third in Demonata series)
Catherynne M. Valente – The Orphan's Tales: In the Night Garden (October 31, first in The Orphan's Tales)
Jeff VanderMeer – Shriek: An Afterword (August 8)
Rick Riordan – The Sea of MonstersHistoricalKunal Basu – RacistsBernard CornwellThe Lords of the NorthSharpe's FuryDebra Dean – The Madonnas of LeningradCharles Frazier – Thirteen Moons (October 3)
Michael Moorcock – The Vengeance of Rome (January 5, fourth in the Pyat Quartet)
Naomi Novik – Temeraire (January 7)
Sarah Waters – The Night Watch (March 23)
Jack Whyte – Knights of the Black and White (August 8, first in the Templar Trilogy)
Gene Wolfe – Soldier of Sidon (October 31, third book in the Soldier series)HorrorJames Patterson & Peter de Jonge – Beach Road (May 1)
Victor Heck – Downward Spiral (November 27)
Stephen KingCell (January 24)Lisey's Story (October 24)
Thomas Ligotti – Teatro GrottescoJames Robert Smith and Stephen Mark Rainey (ed.) – EvermoreHumor and satireMax Barry – Company (January 17)
Ben Elton – Chart ThrobBobby Henderson – The Gospel of the Flying Spaghetti Monster (March 28)
Maddox – The Alphabet of Manliness (June)
Carl Hiaasen – Nature Girl (November 14)
Vladimir Sorokin – Day of the OprichnikMystery and crimeGilbert Adair – The Act of Roger MurgatroydRobert Baer – Blow the House Down a novel, (May 30)
Mary Higgins Clark – Two Little Girls in BlueRanj Dhaliwal – Daaku (October 6)
Michael Connelly – Echo Park (October 9)
Patricia CornwellAt Risk (May 23, first in the At Risk series)Book of the Dead (October 24, 15th in Kay Scarpetta series)
Clive Cussler – Treasure of Khan (December 5)
Jeffery DeaverThe Cold Moon (May 30, seventh in the Lincoln Rhyme series)More Twisted (December 16)
Nelson DeMille – Wild Fire (November 6)
Thomas Harris – Hannibal Rising (December 5, fourth in Hannibal Lecter series)
Tony Hillerman – The Shape Shifter (November 1, 12th in  Joe Leaphorn/Jim Chee series)
Dean Koontz – The Husband (May 30)
Stieg Larsson (died 2004) – The Girl Who Played with Fire (Flickan som lekte med elden)Val McDermid – The Grave Tattoo (February 6)
James PattersonCross (November 14, 12th in Alex Cross series)Judge and Jury (July 31)
James Patterson & Maxine Paetro – The 5th Horseman (February 13)
Michael Slade – Kamikaze (November 7)
Thomas Sullivan – The Water Wolf (October 3)
Andrew Vachss – Mask MarketSamantha Weinberg – Secret Servant: The Moneypenny DiariesJack Whyte – The Eagle (December 26, ninth in Camulod Chronicles series)RomanceKaren Marie Moning – Darkfever (October 31)
Stephenie Meyer – New MoonNicholas Sparks – Dear John (October 30)
Danielle Steel – H. R. H. (October 31)ScifiAaron Allston – Betrayal (May 30, first in Legacy of the Force series)
Elizabeth Bear – Carnival (November 28)
Troy Denning – Tempest (November 28)
David Louis Edelman – Infoquake (July 5, first in Jump 225 trilogy)
Drew Karpyshyn – Path of Destruction: a Novel of the New Republic (September 26)
Paul Levinson – The Plot to Save Socrates (February 6)
Cormac McCarthy – The Road (September 26)
Yvonne Navarro – Ultraviolet (March 1)
Tim Powers – Three Days to Never (August 1)
J. D. Robb – Born in Death (November 7, 23rd in In Death series)
Masamune Shirow – Ghost in the Shell 1.5: Human Error ProcessorCharles Stross – Glasshouse (June 27)
Karen TravissBloodlines (August 29, second in Legacy of the Force series)Triple Zero (second in Star Wars: Republic Commando series)
Peter Watts – Blindsight (October 3)
Stephen Woodworth – From Black Rooms (October 31, fourth in Violet series)
Timothy Zahn – Outbound Flight (January 31)

Drama
Salvatore Antonio – In Gabriel's KitchenJacob M. Appel – ArborophiliaTanya Barfield – Blue DoorHoward Brenton – In ExtremisGregory Burke – Black WatchJohn Cariani – Almost MaineNilo Cruz – Beauty of the FatherBrian Friel – Faith HealerRichard Greenberg – A Naked Girl on the Appian WayRinne Groff – What ThenLisa Kron – WellNeil Labute – Fat PigDavid Lindsay-Abaire – Rabbit HoleItamar Moses – Bach at LeipzigJoël Pommerat – Cet enfantNina Raine – RabbitAdam Rapp – Red Light WinterPoetry

Non-fiction
Chris Anderson – The Long Tail: Why the Future of Business Is Selling Less of MoreDebby Applegate – The Most Famous Man in AmericaKaren Armstrong – Muhammad: A Prophet for Our TimePhilip Ball – The Devil's Doctor: Paracelsus and the World of Renaissance Magic and ScienceAlison Bechdel – Fun HomeChristopher Catherwood – A Brief History of the Middle EastRajiv Chandrasekaran – Imperial Life in the Emerald City: Inside Iraq's Green ZoneJulia Child with Alex Prud'homme – My Life in FranceJean-Pierre Corteggiani – The Pyramids of Giza: Facts, Legends and MysteriesRichard Dawkins – The God DelusionAlain de Botton – The Architecture of HappinessNora Ephron – I Feel Bad About My NeckLarry Fassler – Busted by the FedsWayne Federman with Marshall Terrill and Pete Maravich – MaravichAl Gore – An Inconvenient TruthGlenn Greenwald – How Would a Patriot Act? Defending American Values from a President Run AmokJohn Grisham – The Innocent Man: Murder and Injustice in a Small TownNicky Hager – The Hollow MenTsuyoshi Hasegawa (長谷川毅) – Racing the Enemy: Stalin, Truman, and the Surrender of JapanDerrick Jensen – EndgameElizabeth Kolbert – Field Notes from a CatastropheChristian Kracht, Eva Munz and Lukas Nikol – The Ministry of Truth (Die totale Erinnerung)
Rohan Kriwaczek – An Incomplete History of the Art of Funerary ViolinLinden MacIntyre – CausewayLarry Miller – Spoiled Rotten America: Outrages of Contemporary LifeDouglas Murray – Neoconservatism: Why We Need ItMax Nemni and Monique Nemni – Young Trudeau: Son of Quebec, Father of Canada, 1919–1944John Ramsden – Don't Mention the War: How the British and the Germans Survived Bombing in World War IIRuth Scurr – Fatal Purity: Robespierre and the French RevolutionRichard Sennett – The Culture of the New CapitalismZhi Gang Sha – Soul, Mind, Body MedicinePeter Sloterdijk – Rage and Time (Zorn und Zeit)Tavis Smiley – What I Know For Sure: My Story of Growing Up in AmericaDavid Suzuki – David Suzuki: The AutobiographyHywel Williams – Days That Changed the World: the 50 Defining Events of World HistoryTrish Wood – What Was Asked of Us: An Oral History of the Iraq War by the Soldiers Who Fought ItDeaths
January 4 – Irving Layton, Canadian poet (born 1912)
January 12 – Hilda Ellis Davidson, English antiquarian and academic (born 1914)
January 16 – Jan Mark, English children's writer (born 1943)
January 19 – Awn Alsharif Qasim, Sudanese author and scholar (born 1933)
January 30 – Wendy Wasserstein, American playwright (born 1950)
February 2 – Chris Doty, Canadian dramatist (born 1966)
February 4 – Betty Friedan, American feminist writer (born 1921)
February 8 – Michael Gilbert, English crime writer (born 1912)
February 9 – Ena Lamont Stewart, Scottish playwright (born 1912)
February 11 – Peter Benchley, American novelist (born 1940)
February 17 – Sybille Bedford, German-born English novelist and journalist (born 1911)
February 20 – Lucjan Wolanowski (Lucjan Kon), Polish writer, journalist and traveler (born 1920)
February 21
Gennadiy Aygi, Chuvashian poet and translator (born 1934)
Theodore Draper, American historian (born 1912)
February 22 – Hilde Domin, German writer (born 1909)
February 24 – Octavia E. Butler, American science fiction writer (born 1947) 
February 25 – Margaret Gibson, Canadian novelist and story writer (born 1948)
March 27 – Stanisław Lem, Polish science fiction writer (born 1921)
March 30 – John McGahern, Irish novelist, dramatist and short story writer (born 1934)
April 3 – Muhammad al-Maghut, Syrian Ismaili poet (born 1934)
April 6 – Leslie Norris, Anglo-Welsh poet and author (born 1921)
April 8 – Gerard Reve, Dutch novelist and poet (born 1923)
April 13 – Muriel Spark, Scottish-born novelist (born 1918)
April 25 – Jane Jacobs, American urban planning critic and activist (born 1916)
May 9 – Jerzy Ficowski, poet, writer and translator (born 1924)
May 16 – Clare Boylan, Irish novelist (born 1948)
May 18 – Gilbert Sorrentino, American novelist and poet (born 1929)
June 17 – James H. McClure, South African-born crime writer (born 1939)
June 28 – Nigel Cox, New Zealand novelist (born 1951)
July 17 – Mickey Spillane, American crime writer (born 1918)
July 28 – David Gemmell, English fantasy novelist (born 1948)
August 16 – Alex Buzo, Australian playwright and author (born 1944)
August 17 – Shamsur Rahman, Bengali poet (born 1929)
August 21 – S. Yizhar, Israeli novelist (born 1916)
August 25 – Silva Kaputikyan, Armenian poet (born 1919)
August 30 – Naguib Mahfouz, Egyptian novelist, 1988 Nobel laureate (born 1911)
September 1 – György Faludy, Hungarian poet, writer and translator (born 1910)
September 12 – Edna Staebler CM, Canadian author and literary journalist (born 1906)
October 13 – Protiva Bose, Bengali writer and singer (born 1915)
October 17 – Ursula Moray Williams, English children's writer (born 1911)
October 25 – Paul Ableman, English writer of erotic fiction and playwright (born 1927)
November 1 – William Styron, American novelist (born 1925)
November 6 – Nelson S. Bond, American writer (born 1908)
November 9 – Ellen Willis, American journalist and critic (born 1941)
November 10 – Jack Williamson, American science fiction author (born 1908)
November 15 – George G. Blackburn MC, Canadian author (born 1917)
November 23
Jesús Blancornelas, Mexican journalist (born 1936)
Richard Clements, English journalist (born 1928)
November 24
William Diehl, American author (born 1924)
Phyllis Fraser, American writer, publisher and actor (born 1916)
George W. S. Trow, American writer and media critic (born 1943)
November 27 – Bebe Moore Campbell, American author (born 1950)
December 21 – Philippa Pearce, English children's writer (born 1920)
December 26 – John Heath-Stubbs, English poet and translator (born 1918)

Awards
Nobel Prize in Literature: Orhan Pamuk
–––
2006 Governor General's Awards: see article
Astrid Lindgren Memorial Award: Katherine Paterson
The Australian/Vogel Literary Award: Belinda Castles, The River BaptistsCaine Prize for African Writing: Mary Watson, "Jungfrau"
Camões Prize: José Luandino Vieira (declined)
Compton Crook Award: Maria Snyder, Poison StudyC. J. Dennis Prize for Poetry: John Tranter, Urban Myths: 210 PoemsEdna Staebler Award for Creative Non-Fiction: Francis Chalifour, AfterEric Gregory Award: Fiona Benson, Retta Bowen, Frances Leviston, Jonathan Morley, Eoghan Walls
Europe Theatre Prize: Harold Pinter
Griffin Poetry Prize: Sylvia Legris, Nerve Squall, and Kamau Brathwaite, Born to Slow HorsesJames Tait Black Memorial Prize for fiction: Cormac McCarthy, The RoadJames Tait Black Memorial Prize for biography: Byron Rogers, The Man Who Went into the West: The life of R.S. ThomasKenneth Slessor Prize for Poetry: Jaya Savige, LatecomersLambda Literary Awards: Multiple categories; see 2006 Lambda Literary Awards.
Man Booker Prize: Kiran Desai, The Inheritance of Loss.Miles Franklin Award: Roger McDonald, The Ballad of Desmond KaleNational Book Award for Fiction: Richard Powers, The Echo Maker 
National Book Critics Circle Award: Kiran Desai, The Inheritance of Loss 
Orange Prize for Fiction: Zadie Smith, On Beauty 
PEN/Faulkner Award for Fiction: E. L. Doctorow, The March 
Pulitzer Prize for Fiction: Geraldine Brooks, March 
Premio Nadal: Eduardo Lago, Llámame BrooklynQueen's Gold Medal for Poetry: Fleur Adcock
SAARC Literary Award: Maitreyi Pushpa, Zahida Hina, Laxman Gaikwad, Tissa Abeysekara 
Scotiabank Giller Prize: Vincent Lam, Bloodletting and Miraculous Cures''
Wallace Stevens Award: Michael Palmer
Whiting Awards: Fiction: Charles D’Ambrosio, Yiyun Li, Micheline Aharonian Marcom, Nina Marie Martínez, Patrick O’Keeffe; Plays: Stephen Adly Guirgis, Bruce Norris; Poetry: Sherwin Bitsui, Tyehimba Jess, Suji Kwock Kim

See also
List of literary awards
List of poetry awards
2006 in Australian literature
2006 in comics

Notes

References

 
Years of the 21st century in literature